Mechanical Dream is a role-playing game designed by Francis Larose & Benjamin Paquette. It was originally published in 2002 by SteamLogic until the company's bankruptcy in 2004, after which Larose and Paquette started a new company under the name SteamLogic Editions in 2004.

Setting

Overview
Characters reside in the world of the dual world of Kaïnas and Naakinis, a 30,000 mile disk lit by a sun-like orb called the Pendulum.  This disk is surrounded by the Sofe, a 40-mile-tall wall of black ether that few, if any, have ever returned from.  Kaïnas (the rational world) and Naakinis (the mythic world) exist with overlapping topography and ecosystems.  Flora and fauna of Kainas are scaled normally by real-world standards, while Naakinis exists on a much larger scale (such as the "Kioux" trees that reach many miles in height).  In general, the word "Kaïnas" denotes the disk illuminated by the Pendulum, but "Naakinis" extends further and includes whatever lies in and beyond the Sofe.

Dream, Aran, & Reality
The Pendulum spends roughly ten of each day's thirty hours beyond the Sofe, creating night-like darkness.  During this time, a phenomenon called "The Dream" manifests, becoming stronger as less and less light permeates Kaïnas.  The Dream is a fabulous and dangerous world that overlaps with reality.  It is initially hazy and hallucinatory, becoming as solid as reality during the darkest parts of the night.  Areas where the Pendulum does not shine are affected by permanent manifestations of the Dream.

The Aran world is a separate existence, accessible only in places the Pendulums' light cannot reach (underground or deep underwater).  It is fiercely primordial, rejecting inorganic matter and operating by rules entirely different from reality.  The creatures inhabiting Aran are unpredictable and poorly understood.

Orpee & Eflow
The vast majority of the setting's population depends on the weekly consumption of the orpee fruit to survive.  Without orpee, a rapid and excruciating death is guaranteed.  Orpee naturally concentrates a life-force called "eflow" that fuels life.  The politics and economics of Kaïnas are primarily driven by the collection and distribution of orpee, as it is an absolute requirement for life.

Races of Kainas

Ten races can be found in Kaïnas.

 Emovan: Aquatic craftsmen with a strongly collectivist society.
 Frilin: An intellectual plant-based race who do not require orpee to survive.
 Gnath: A highly rational people who are the driving force behind modernization.
 Inaïs: The only race able to harvest orpee, who live as passionate ascetics.
 Nayan: A deeply passionate and charismatic race driven by a powerful martyrdom complex.
 Odwoane: A diminutive race of mimicking laborers who instinctively gather and act in groups.
 Solek: A race that emerged from the Sofe, characterized by their silence and efficiency
 Volkoï: A race bred for war and physically dependent on a constant flow of adrenaline.
 Yaki: A collection of tightly knit nomadic tribes with a strong understanding of the Dream.
 Zïn: Extremely rare, solitary beings who carry within them a volatile Aran entity.

Echoes

The heroes of Kaïnas are called Echoes.  Able to harness eflow to produce miraculous effect using their "Gifts," they are also able to gain information and insight through a "Whisper," the so-called voice of eflow that speaks to each Echo.  There exist many different "vocations" for Echoes, castes that delineate their personalities and abilities:

 Awakener: Healers and animators of the inanimate.
 Guardians: Marksmen and defenders.
 Judge: Champions of social order and fair justice.
 Judicator: Brutal warriors who police other Echoes.
 Mind Chemist: Psychics able to enter the minds of others.
 Nightmare: Violent predators who become one with the Dream.
 Overlord: Overseers who seek and succeed at control over others.
 Truth Crafter: Scholars and storytellers with the power of illusion.
 Walker: Hardened drifters and explorers.
 War Engine: Masters of all things martial.

System

Gameplay is overseen by an "Absolute Judge" (the gamemaster).

References

External links
 SteamLogic homepage

Fantasy role-playing games
Role-playing games introduced in 2002